Sunburst is a 1975 American thriller film directed by James Polakof. The film is also known as Slashed Dreams (American video title), and stars Peter Hooten, Kathrine Baumann, Ric Carrott, Anne Lockhart, Robert Englund and Rudy Vallee.

Premise 
A pair of students go on a trip up to the mountains to look for a former college friend who has dropped out to become a hermit, and encounter two rednecks who assault them.

Cast 
Peter Hooten as Robert
Kathrine Baumann as Jenny
Ric Carrott as Marshall
Anne Lockhart as Tina
Robert Englund as Michael Sutherland
Rudy Vallee as Proprietor
James Keach as Levon
David Pritchard as Danker
Randy Ralston as The Pledge
Susan McCormick as Susan
Peter Brown as The Professor

Soundtrack 
 Roberta Van Dere - "Pretty Things" (Words and Music by Ed Bogas)
 Roberta Van Dere - "I'm Ready" (Words and Music by Ed Bogas)
 Roberta Van Dere - "Animals Are Clumsy Too" (Words and Music by Ed Bogas)
 Roberta Van Dere - "Take The Time" (Words and Music by Ed Bogas)
 Roberta Van Dere - "Mornin'" (Words and Music by Ed Bogas)
 Roberta Van Dere - "Theme From Sunburst" (Words and Music by Ed Bogas)

See also 
 List of American films of 1975

References

External links 

1975 films
1970s thriller films
American thriller films
Films scored by Ed Bogas
1970s English-language films
1970s American films